Monte Dinero (literally, "Mount Money") is a town on the southeastern tip of Patagonia, in Santa Cruz Province, Argentina. Most of the land around Monte Dinero is devoted to sheep and cattle ranching.

Populated places in Santa Cruz Province, Argentina